Ladenbek is a small river of Hamburg, Germany. It flows into the Bille near Hamburg-Lohbrügge.

See also
List of rivers of Hamburg

Rivers of Hamburg
Rivers of Germany